Saint-Joseph-de-Beauce is a city in the Municipalité régionale de comté Beauce-Centre in Quebec, Canada. It is part of the Chaudière-Appalaches region and the population was 5,014 as of the Canada 2021 Census.

The new city constitution dates from 1999, when the city of Saint-Joseph-de-Beauce and the parish municipality of Saint-Joseph-de-Beauce amalgamated. However, the territory was settled as a seigneurie in 1736 under Pierre de Rigaud de Vaudreuil, which makes it the oldest settlement in Beauce. In 1747, Vaudreuil would exchange it to Joseph de Fleury de La Gorgendière, who would initiate the development of the settlement.

Saint-Joseph-de-Beauce is the seat of the judicial district of Beauce.

Saint-Joseph-de-Beauce holds an annual Truck drag race event, the Accélération de camions à St-Joseph-de-Beauce (Big Rig Drag Racing) which established in 2004. It attracts over 25,000 visitors from all over Canada and much of the United States.

Demographics 

Notable people 
 Henri Sévérin Béland, doctor, mayor and politician
 Vital Cliche, politician
 Junior Lessard, Deutsche Eishockey Liga player
 Raphaël Lessard, NASCAR driver
 Adrien Ouellette, politician
 Joseph Poirier, politician
 Gabriel-Elzéar Taschereau, seigneur, judge and politician
 Thomas Linière Taschereau, lawyer, mayor and politician

References

Commission de toponymie du Québec
Ministère des Affaires municipales, des Régions et de l'Occupation du territoire

Incorporated places in Chaudière-Appalaches
Cities and towns in Quebec
Populated places established in 1736